Glenn Matthew Keeley (born 1 September 1954 in Barking, Essex) is an English retired footballer who played as a central defender in the Football League.

Honours

Club
Newcastle United
 Football League Cup runner-up (1): 1975–76

Blackburn Rovers
 Football League Third Division runner-up (1): 1979–80
 Full Members Cup winner (1): 1986–87

References

External links
Glen Keeley's Career
Ex Wanderers star in new signing

1954 births
Living people
English footballers
Footballers from Barking, London
Association football defenders
Ipswich Town F.C. players
Newcastle United F.C. players
Blackburn Rovers F.C. players
Everton F.C. players
Oldham Athletic A.F.C. players
Colchester United F.C. players
Bolton Wanderers F.C. players
Chorley F.C. players
Colne Dynamoes F.C. players
National League (English football) players
English Football League players